Dumfries and Galloway is a county constituency in the House of Commons of the Parliament of the United Kingdom. It was first used in the 2005 general election, and replaced Galloway and Upper Nithsdale and part of Dumfries. It elects one Member of Parliament (MP) by the first past the post system of election.

Constituency profile
This is a large and rural seat with significant farming and forestry sectors, including the Galloway Forest Park. Dumfries is an economic hub for south Scotland and Stranraer was formerly a port for connections to Ireland.

Boundaries 

As created by the Fifth Review of the Boundary Commission for Scotland the constituency is one of six covering the Dumfries and Galloway council area, the Scottish Borders council area and the South Lanarkshire council area. The other five constituencies are: Berwickshire, Roxburgh and Selkirk, Dumfriesshire, Clydesdale and Tweeddale, East Kilbride, Strathaven and Lesmahagow, Lanark and Hamilton East and Rutherglen and Hamilton West.

The Dumfries and Galloway constituency covers part of the Dumfries and Galloway council area. The rest of the council area is covered by the Dumfriesshire, Clydesdale and Tweeddale constituency, which also covers part of the Scottish Borders council area and part of the South Lanarkshire council area.

The Dumfries and Galloway constituency consists of the electoral wards of:

In whole: Stranraer and The Rhins, Mid Galloway and Wigtown West, Dee and Glenkins, Castle Douglas and Crocketford, Abbey, North West Dumfries
In part: Mid and Upper Nithsdale, Lochar, Nith

Politics

Dumfries and Galloway's predecessor seats, Galloway and Upper Nithsdale (1983-2005) and Galloway (1918–83), had been represented by Conservative MPs in all but two parliaments since 1931. Galloway and Upper Nithsdale was won by the Scottish National Party in 1997 but became the only Scottish seat to return a Conservative MP at the 2001 general election.

Boundary changes for the 2005 election saw the new seat have a very slim Labour majority over the Conservatives, and the SNP were in close third place. Russell Brown was the Labour candidate, who had been the MP for the neighbouring seat of Dumfriesshire since 1997, and Peter Duncan, the sitting MP for Galloway and Upper Nithsdale, stood as the Conservative candidate. Although the seat was the Conservatives' second target seat across Britain, Labour increased its vote share and Russell Brown was elected as the constituency's MP.

In 2010, Duncan attempted once again to become Dumfries and Galloway's MP. However the election produced a swing against the Conservatives in the seat, and it was held by Labour's Russell Brown with a majority of 7,449 votes. The SNP's share of the vote in the constituency collapsed at the 2005 general election, and remained static in 2010. In 2015, the seat was won by the SNP's Richard Arkless with a 6,514 vote majority. The Conservative share of the vote stayed similar to the 2010 election, whereas Labour polled third, receiving 24.7% of the vote compared to 45.9% in 2010. In 2017, Alister Jack gained the seat for the Conservatives, making him one of a dozen new Scottish Conservative MPs. Jack held the seat in 2019 with a reduced majority despite increasing his vote share.

Members of Parliament

Election results

Elections in the 2010s

Elections in the 2000s

References

External links 
The boundaries of the constituency, and its predecessors, can be viewed at Scottish Boundaries Commission's Map Browser.
The boundaries of the constituency can also be viewed at the Ordnance Survey's Election Maps site.

Politics of Dumfries and Galloway
Westminster Parliamentary constituencies in Scotland
Dumfries and Galloway